Thomas Leigh Gatch (August 9, 1891 – December 16, 1954) was an American naval officer and attorney in the 20th century. A native of Oregon, and grandson of educator Thomas Milton Gatch, he served in the United States Navy as a ship commander during World War II and Judge Advocate General of the Navy from 1943 to 1945. His last command was as commander of the Atlantic Fleet's service force.

Early life
Thomas L. Gatch was born on August 9, 1891, in Salem, Oregon to Claude Gatch and Helen Plummer. His grandfather had been the president of Willamette University in Salem, and both his father and grandfather served as mayor of the town. Thomas began his college career at Oregon Agricultural College where his grandfather served as president from 1897 to 1907. However he later transferred to the United States Naval Academy in Annapolis, Maryland and graduated in 1912.

Naval career
After college, Gatch spent five years at sea before joining the Navy's Judge Advocate General's Office (JAG) in 1919 in Washington, D.C. In D.C., he studied law at George Washington University Law School where in 1922 he earned his law degree. Gatch then went back to active duty aboard a ship, before teaching for three years at the Naval Academy.

In 1935, he returned to the JAG's headquarters where he remained through 1938. Gatch then returned to sea until 1940. That year he began serving as Assistant Judge Advocate General, keeping that post until February 1942 after World War II began. Serving in the South Pacific until December 1942, commanding the South Dakota in the Pacific Theater of Operations in battles such as the Battle of the Santa Cruz Islands during the Guadalcanal campaign. He received two Navy Crosses for his service. Gatch's time in command was not without controversy. He was, correctly or incorrectly, blamed for a number of incidents involving his command; the grounding of his ship in Tonga in mid-1942, his collision with the destroyer  in late 1942, and the inclusion in his crew of a 12-year-old boy - Calvin Graham - who was wounded during the Guadalcanal campaign. While Gatch's time in command was not without victory and success, his reports were often criticized for gross exaggerations of success. Gatch's actions during the Naval Battle of Guadalcanal included a fateful decision to initially engage the Japanese battleship Kirishima with his secondary battery only. During the subsequent fighting, the South Dakota suffered significant casualties, among them Gatch. Gatch was injured by shell splinters when the bridge of the South Dakota was struck by shells from the Kirishima.

In 1943, Gatch was invalided to shore duty, officially due to his wounds. Gatch became the 16th Judge Advocate General of the United States Navy. He remained in that position until December 3, 1945, when he became the commander of the service force of the Atlantic Fleet. Vice Admiral Thomas Leigh Gatch retired from the Navy in 1947.

Later life and family
From 1945 to 1947, Gatch served as a trustee at George Washington University. Thomas had one sibling, Orytha. He had three children with his wife; Thomas Leigh Gatch, Jr., Nancy, and Eleanor. His son Thomas Jr. attended the United States Army's service academy at West Point and disappeared in 1974, whilst attempting the first crossing of the Atlantic Ocean by balloon.

After retiring from the Navy, Gatch returned to his native Oregon. He died on December 16, 1954, in San Diego, California, and is buried there at Fort Rosecrans National Cemetery.

References

External links
Oral History Interview with George Meader

1891 births
1954 deaths
United States Navy personnel of World War I
Burials at Fort Rosecrans National Cemetery
Judge Advocates General of the United States Navy
Oregon State University alumni
People from Salem, Oregon
Recipients of the Navy Cross (United States)
United States Naval Academy alumni
United States Navy vice admirals
United States Navy World War II admirals
Military personnel from Oregon